The Rough Habit Plate is a Brisbane Racing Club Group 3 Thoroughbred horse race for horses three years old with set weights, over a distance of 2,000 metres held at Doomben Racecourse in Brisbane, Australia during the Queensland Winter Racing Carnival. Total prize money is A$250,000.

History
It was named in honour of Rough Habit, a New Zealand-bred Thoroughbred racehorse who won 11 Group One (G1) races on both sides of the Tasman Sea. The inaugural running of the race was in 1993 as the Rough Habit 3YO Handicap.

The event is the first middle distance race for three-year-olds during the winter carnival and is a prep leadup race for the 2400 metre Group 1 Queensland Derby at Eagle Farm Racecourse in June.

Jockey Damien Oliver has won this race on five occasions: 
1997, 2001, 2002, 2007, 2008.

Six horses have won the Rough Habit Plate–Queensland Derby double:
Tenor (1994), Dodge (1998), De Gaulle Lane (2001), Empires Choice (2007), Brambles (2012), Hawkspur (2013)

Grade
1996–2005 - Listed Race
2006 onwards Group 3

Distance
1993–2001 – 2020 metres 
2002–2003 – 2200 metres
2004–2011 – 2020 metres 
2012 – 2000 metres
2013 – 2100 metres
2014–2019 – 2000 metres
2020 – 2200 metres
2022 – 2143 metres

Venue
2013 - Eagle Farm Racecourse
2020 - Eagle Farm Racecourse
2022 - Eagle Farm Racecourse

Winners

 2022 - Dark Destroyer
 2021 - Criminal Defence
 2020 - Ballistic Boy
 2019 - Purple Sector
 2018 - Dark Dream
 2017 - Shocking Luck
 2016 - Mackintosh
 2015 - Sadler's Lake
 2014 - Amexed
 2013 - Hawkspur
 2012 - Brambles
 2011 - Fillydelphia
 2010 - The Hombre
 2009 - Rockdale
 2008 - Mission Critical
 2007 - Empires Choice
 2006 - Belmonte   
 2005 - Activation               
 2004 - Russian Pearl            
 2003 - Bobs Boy  
 2002 - Distinctly Secret         
 2001 - De Gaulle Lane        
 2000 - Kincourt     
 1999 - Figurehead 
 1998 - Dodge 
 1997 - Marble Halls 
 1996 - Revenge 
 1995 - Juggler
 1994 - Tenor
 1993 - Square the Circle

See also
 List of Australian Group races
 Group races

References

Horse races in Australia
Sport in Brisbane